Ioannis Ladas (1920 – 16 October 2010) was a member of the Greek military junta of 1967–1974.

He was born and raised in the village of Dirahi, Arcadia.

In 1940, he graduated from the Hellenic Military Academy along with George Papadopoulos and Nikolaos Makarezos. He fought, as an officer, in the Greco-Italian War of 1940.

In the mid 1960s, Ladas had been associated with a small, far-right 4th of August Party, and contributed many articles to the party's journal, which the British historian Richard Clogg called a "racist and anti-Semitic" magazine which glorified not only the 4th of August Regime, but also the Third Reich. As a colonel in 1967, he was in charge of the Greek Military Police stationed in Athens and ordered the arrest of several prominent politicians and military personnel not allied to the orchestrators of the coup d'état. He first served in the resulting regime as general secretary in the ministries of public order and tourism.

In the summer of 1968, Ladas stormed into the office of the magazine Eikones and personally beat up its editor Panayiotis Lambrias. Ladas had been enraged at Eikones because it published an article saying that homosexuality was accepted as normal in ancient Greece. When the BBC's Greek service reported the incident, Ladas gave a much publicised rant at a press conference, denouncing the BBC as he maintained that all of its journalists were homosexuals who were biased against him. The rant made him into a sort of unofficial spokesman for the regime.

At a subsequent speech before a visiting group of sympathetic Greek-Americans on 6 August 1968 who come to offer their support, Ladas quoted Friderich Nietzsche's statement that the ancient Greeks invented everything and went on to say: "Foreigners confess and acknowledge Greek superiority. Human civilization was wholly fashioned by our race. Even the enemies of Greece recognize that civilization is an exclusively Greek creation". In the same speech, Ladas denounced young men with long hair as "the degenerate phenomenon of hippyism", calling hippies "anti-social elements, drug addicts, sex maniacs, thieves, etc. It is only natural that they should be enemies of the army and the ideals which the military way of life serves". Ladas ended his speech by arguing that Greeks for racial reasons were still the world's preeminent people, but had only declined of inadequate leadership, a problem which had been solved by the "revolution" of 21 April 1967.  Ladas claimed that Greece under military leadership would be "cured" of its problems and resume its rightful place in the world.

Later, he was minister for the interior and for social services.

On 23 August 1975, he was sentenced to life imprisonment during the Greek Junta Trials.

He died in Kalamata on 16 October 2010.

Books
Clogg, Richard "The Ideology of the "revolution of 21 April 1967'" p. 36-58 from Greece Under Military Rule edited by Richard Clogg & George Yannopoloulos; London: Secker & Warburg, 1971

References

1920 births
2010 deaths
Greek colonels
Leaders of the Greek junta
Hellenic Army officers
People convicted of treason against Greece
People from Arcadia, Peloponnese